Medial epicondyle can refer to:
 Medial epicondyle of the humerus (ventral epicondyle in birds)
 Medial epicondyle of the femur